Ukraine competed in the Summer Olympic Games as an independent nation for the first time at the 1996 Summer Olympics in Atlanta, United States. Previously, Ukrainian athletes competed for the Unified Team at the 1992 Summer Olympics. 231 competitors, 146 men and 85 women, took part in 148 events in 21 sports.

As of 2021, this is Ukraine's best ever result in terms of gold medals and best result in terms of overall medals (the latter feat is shared with their 2000 team.

Medalists

Gold
 Inessa Kravets — Athletics, Women's Triple Jump
 Wladimir Klitschko — Boxing, Men's Super Heavyweight
 Rustam Sharipov — Gymnastics, Men's Parallel Bars
 Lilia Podkopayeva — Gymnastics, Women's All-Around Individual
 Lilia Podkopayeva — Gymnastics, Women's Floor Exercises
 Kateryna Serebrianska — Gymnastics, Women's Rhythmic All-Around
 Yevhen Braslavets and Ihor Matviyenko — Sailing, Men's 470 Team Competition
 Timur Taymazov — Weightlifting, Men's Heavyweight (108 kg)
 Vyacheslav Oleynyk — Wrestling, Men's Greco-Roman 90 kg

Silver
 Lilia Podkopayeva — Gymnastics, Women's Balance Beam
 Inna Frolova, Svitlana Maziy, Dina Miftakhutdynova, and Olena Ronzhyna — Rowing, Women's Quadruple Sculls

Bronze
 Olena Sadovnycha — Archery, Women's Individual Competition
 Oleksandr Bahach — Athletics, Men's Shot Put
 Oleksandr Krykun — Athletics, Men's Hammer Throw
 Inha Babakova — Athletics, Women's High Jump
 Oleg Kiryukhin — Boxing, Men's Light Flyweight
 Ihor Korobchynskyi, Oleh Kosyak, Hryhoriy Misyutyn, Volodymyr Shamenko, Rustam Sharipov, Oleksandr Svitlychnyi, and Yuri Yermakov — Gymnastics, Men's Team Combined Exercises
 Olena Vitrychenko — Gymnastics, Women's Rhythmic All-Around
 Olena Pakholchik and Ruslana Taran — Sailing, Women's 470 Team Competition
 Denys Hotfrid — Weightlifting, Men's 99 kg
 Andriy Kalashnykov — Wrestling, Men's Greco-Roman Flyweight (52 kg)
 Elbrus Tedeyev — Wrestling, Men's Freestyle Featherweight (62 kg)
 Zaza Zazirov — Wrestling, Men's Freestyle Lightweight (68 kg)

Archery

Men

Women

Athletics

Men
Track & road events

Field events

Combined events – Decathlon

Women
Track & road events

Field events

Badminton

Basketball

Women's tournament

Team roster
The following players represented Ukraine:
 Ruslana Kyrychenko
 Viktoriya Burenok
 Olena Zhyrko
 Maryna Tkachenko
 Liudmyla Nazarenko
 Olena Oberemko
 Viktoriya Paradiz
 Viktoriya Leleka
 Oksana Dovhaliuk
 Diana Sadovnykova
 Nataliya Silianova
 Olha Shliakhova
Preliminary round
The four best teams from each group advanced to the quarterfinal round.

Quarterfinals

Semifinals

Bronze medal match

Boxing

Men

Canoeing

Sprint
Men

Women

Qualification Legend: 'R = Qualify to repechage; QS = Qualify to semi-final; QF = Qualify directly to final

Cycling

Road
Men

Women

Track
1000m time trial

Individual Pursuit

Points race

Diving

Men
	
Women

Fencing

Six fencers, four men and two women, represented Ukraine in 1996.
Men

Women

Gymnastics

Men
The Ukraine alternates were Boris Zelepoukin, and Vladmir Portnko. Boris Zelepoukin was almost brought in because of Grigory Mistuin not performing up to standards.  
Team
Individual finals

Women
The Women alternates were Oksana Knizhnik and Irina Bulakova. Oksana Knizhnik was brought in after Viktoriya Karpenko was out due to a Wrist Injury. 
Team
Individual finals

Judo

Men

Women

Modern pentathlon

Men

Rhythmic gymnastics

Women

Rowing

Men

Women

Sailing

Men

Women

Open

M = Medal race; EL = Eliminated – did not advance into the medal race; CAN = Race cancelled

Shooting

Men

Women

Swimming

Men

Women

Tennis

Women's doubles
Olga Lugina and Natalia Medvedeva were scheduled to play in the women's doubles event but they withdrew. Their opponents in the first round would have been Manon Bollegraf and Brenda Schultz-McCarthy from the Netherlands.

Volleyball

Women

Preliminary round

Group A

Saturday 1996-07-20

Monday 1996-07-22

Wednesday 1996-07-24

Friday 1996-07-26

Sunday 1996-07-28

 Team roster
Nataliya Bozhenova
Yuliya Buyeva
Olexandra Fomina
Tetyana Ivanyushkyna
Olga Kolomiyets
Alla Kravets
Olena Kryvonossova
Vita Mateshik
Regina Mylosserdova
Olga Pavlova
Mariya Polyakova
Olena Sydorenko
 Head coach: Gariy Iegiazarov

Water polo

Men

Preliminary round

Group B

Saturday July 20, 1996

Sunday July 21, 1996

Monday July 22, 1996

Tuesday July 23, 1996

Wednesday July 24, 1996

Classification round

Friday July 26, 1996

Saturday July 27, 1996

Sunday July 28, 1996

 Team roster
Andriy Kovalenko
Dmytro Andreyev
Ihor Horbach
Vadym Kebalo
Vitaliy Khalchaytsky
Vyacheslav Kostanda
Oleksandr Potulnytsky
Vadym Rozhdestvensky
Vadym Skuratov
Anatoliy Solodun
Dmytro Stratan
Oleh Vladymyrov
Oleksiy Yegorov

Weightlifting

Men

Wrestling

Freestyle

Greco-Roman

References

 

Nations at the 1996 Summer Olympics
1996
Summer Olympics